Marvin Sewell is a blues/jazz guitarist, who has been called maybe "the greatest guitarist you've never heard of". He was born and grew up in Chicago, where he attended the Chicago Musical College at Roosevelt University.

Since 1990, he has been based in New York City. He has played with many leading jazz artists, notably Cassandra Wilson, Jack DeJohnette, Lizz Wright and Jason Moran. He also leads the Marvin Sewell Group.

He performed with Cassandra Wilson on two tracks in the 2003 PBS documentary, Martin Scorsese Presents the Blues: A Musical Journey.

Discography

As leader
 2005: The Worker's Dance

As sideman
 1993:	With All Your Heart, Lonnie Plaxico
 1993: Exile's Gate, Gary Thomas
 1994: Extra Special Edition, Jack DeJohnette
 1994: Stringology, Diedre Murray and Fred Hopkins
 1996:	Overkill, Gary Thomas
 1996:	Art Forum, Greg Osby
 1998: Traveling Miles, Cassandra Wilson
 1999:	Inside, David Sanborn
 1999:	Chicago, Yoron Israel & Organic
 2000:	How Can I Keep From Singing?, René Marie
 2002: Belly of the Sun, Cassandra Wilson
 2003	Wise Children, Tom Harrell
 2004: Same Mother, Jason Moran
 2006:	Artist in Residence, Jason Moran
 2008: Loverly, Cassandra Wilson
 2009:	Closer to You: The Pop Side, Cassandra Wilson
 2010:	Silver Pony, Cassandra Wilson
 2010:	Fellowship, Lizz Wright
 2014:	Southern Comfort, Regina Carter
 2014:	Landmarks, Brian Blade & The Fellowship Band
 2014:	Beautiful Life, Dianne Reeves
 2015: The Evolution of Oneself, Orrin Evans
 2016:	Dazzling Blue: The Music of Paul Simon, Alexis Cole
 2017: Grace, Lizz Wright
 2017:	Ella: Accentuate the Positive, Regina Carter
 2020: Be Water, Christian Sands

References

External links 
 Official web site

Living people
Jazz-blues guitarists
Year of birth missing (living people)